Fleet Center may refer to various facilities in the United States:

TD Garden, a sports arena in Boston, MA
50 Kennedy Plaza, an International-style skyscraper in Providence, RI
The Fleet Science Center, a science museum and planetarium in San Diego, CA

See also
ARC Centre of Excellence in Future Low-Energy Electronics Technologies, also known as the FLEET Centre